Juncus covillei is a species of rush known by the common name Coville's rush native to North America.

Distribution
It is native to western North America from British Columbia to Idaho to California, where it grows in moist habitat, often in forested areas.

Description
This is a perennial herb forming clumps of erect stems up to about 25 centimeters tall from a thick rhizome. The inflorescence is made up of several clusters of brown or green flowers.

External links
Jepson Manual Treatment
Photo gallery

covillei
Plants described in 1906
Flora of the Western United States
Flora of Alaska
Flora of British Columbia
Flora without expected TNC conservation status